Peter Joseph "Pete" Shellem (6 October 1960, Philadelphia–24 October 2009) was an investigative reporter for The Patriot-News. He was instrumental in obtaining the release of five wrongfully convicted innocent people:
 Steven Crawford, imprisoned for life in 1970 for murder at age 14, released after 28 years
 Barry Laughman, imprisoned for life in 1988 for rape and murder, released after 15 years
 David Gladden, imprisoned for life in 1995 for murder, released after 12 years
 Patty Carbone, imprisoned for life in 1984 for first-degree murder, released after 14 years after pleading guilty to a reduced charge of third-degree murder
 Jay C. Smith, sentenced to death in 1979 for triple murder, released after 13 years, after the state Supreme Court found that prosecutorial misconduct barred him from being retried on double jeopardy grounds

Shellem's reporting also led to the conviction and imprisonment for mail fraud of the Pennsylvania Attorney General, Ernie Preate in 1995. After serving a year in jail, Preate said of Shellem: "He is a one-man Innocence Project. You've got to recognize the work that he's done and the value he's given to society. He was there when the justice system failed."

On April 16, 2010, Pete Shellem was posthumously awarded "The 2009 Innocence Network Special Lifetime Achievement Award". This event took place at the 2010 Innocence Network Conference, hosted by the Georgia Innocence Project, in Atlanta. His wife, Joyce Shellem, accepted the award in honor of him.

Death
Shellem died on October 24, 2009, in his home town of Gardners, Pennsylvania. His son reported that Shellem died from suicide, but this has not been confirmed.

Bibliography

References 

American investigative journalists
1960 births
2009 suicides
Writers from Philadelphia
Temple University alumni
American newspaper journalists
American crime reporters
American male journalists
Journalists from Pennsylvania
20th-century American journalists
2009 deaths
Suicides in Pennsylvania